The 2007–08 Magyar Kupa (English: Hungarian Cup) was the 68th season of Hungary's annual knock-out cup football competition.

Quarter-finals
The first legs were played on March 18 and 19, 2008, while the second legs were played on March 25 and 27.

|}

Semi-finals
The first legs were played on April 1 and 2, 2008, while the second legs were played on April 8 and 9.

|}

Final

See also
 2007–08 Nemzeti Bajnokság I
 2007–08 Nemzeti Bajnokság II

References

External links
 Official site 
 soccerway.com

2007–08 in Hungarian football
2007–08 domestic association football cups
2007-08